Air Marshal Michael John McLaren CLM (18 November 1930 – 29 July 2016) was a senior commander in the Rhodesian Air Force.  McLaren was in command of the Rhodesian Air Force from 1973 to 1977.  Thereafter he was Deputy Commander of Combined Operations until 1980 when he retired from military service and worked in the oil industry. He died from cancer in Cape Town, South Africa, on 29 July 2016.

References

|-

1930 births
2016 deaths
Rhodesian people of British descent
White Rhodesian people
Rhodesian military personnel of the Bush War
Rhodesian Air Force air marshals
White South African people
Rhodesian emigrants to South Africa
People from Cape Town